Jonbers Blonde is the stage name of Andrew Glover, a drag performer, model, and entertainer most known for competing on series 4 of RuPaul's Drag Race UK.

Career
Glover is a model and entertainer who performs in drag as Jonbers Blonde (previously JonBenet Blonde). He has also worked as a fashion editor and walked runways in London and Paris, collaborating with Nadine Coyle, Sophie Ellis-Bextor, Melanie C, Sam Smith, and Years & Years.

Jonbers Blonde competed on series 4 of RuPaul's Drag Race UK. She did not received any badges but placed joint-third in the finale. She made a cameo appearance in the series I Hate Suzie.

Personal life
Glover is from Belfast, Northern Ireland.

Filmography

Television
 RuPaul's Drag Race UK (series 4, 2022)
 I Hate Suzie (2022)

References

External links
 Jonbers Blonde at IMDb

Living people
Drag performers
Entertainers
Models (profession)
RuPaul's Drag Race UK contestants